This is a list of airports in Jharkhand, a state in eastern India. The list includes domestic, and international airports.

Contents
This list contains the following information:
 City served - The city generally associated with the airport. This is not always the actual location since some airports are located in smaller towns outside the city they serve.
 ICAO - The location indicator assigned by the International Civil Aviation Organization (ICAO).
 IATA - The airport code assigned by the International Air Transport Association (IATA).
 Airport name - The official airport name. Those shown in bold indicate the airport has scheduled service on commercial airlines.
 Note - Specific information related to the airport

List

References

Sources
 
 Airports Authority of India website: AirportsIndia.org.in or AAI.aero
 
  - includes IATA codes
 Great Circle Mapper - IATA and ICAO codes
 List of Indian Air Force Stations at GlobalSecurity.org
 scribd - Directory of Airports in India with codes and coordinates
 PilotFriend - Indian Airstrips

 
Jharkhand
Buildings and structures in Jharkhand